The Royal Bahraini Air Force (abbreviated as RBAF, formerly known as Bahrain Amiri Air Force) is the aerial warfare branch of the Bahrain Defence Force (BDF).  Originally formed as the BDF Air Wing in 1977, it became an independent service branch in 1987.  Its first combat operations were conducted during the Gulf War.

History 

The Bahrain Defence Force, which itself had come into being after the country's independence from the United Kingdom in 1971, first organized an air wing in 1977.  This small force grew gradually and in 1987, the BDF was reorganized into distinct service branches, with the air wing becoming the new Bahrain Amiri Air Force (BAAF).  After the elections on 14 February 2002, the state changed from an emirate to a kingdom resulting in the renaming of the Armed Forces. The BAAF was consequently given its current title, the Royal Bahraini Air Force (RBAF).

Operations 
The new Air Force was soon involved in its first combat operations during the Iraqi invasion of Kuwait subsequent Gulf War.  Air bases in Bahrain first hosted escaping Kuwait Air Force aircraft and, as air operations against Iraq began, F-5 and F-16 aircraft were used in both defensive and offensive air operations through the conclusion of the Gulf War on 28 February 1991.

Bahrain would again engage in combat operations as part of the Saudi Arabia-led Operation Decisive Storm, operating from bases in Saudi Arabia against Houthi rebel forces in Yemen during March and April 2015.  Initially, fifteen F-16 aircraft were deployed as the RBAF contribution to combat forces in the operation.  Bahrain's forces remained in Saudi Arabia in assistance of the coalition through 2015. An RBAF F-16 was lost when it crashed after a technical problem in December 2015.

Equipment 
The BDF Air Wing was originally equipped with only helicopters, but it entered the ranks of jet fighter operators with the acquisition of Northrop F-5 fighters from the United States.  These aircraft were of limited capability in comparison with the fighters entering service with other Gulf states such as Iran, Iraq, and Saudi Arabia.  Bahrain had sought to purchase a more advanced aircraft, and considered several American and European fighter aircraft including the F-15 Eagle, F-16 Fighting Falcon, F/A-18 Hornet, Mirage 2000, and Tornado. They initially selected the F-16, but the United States only offered the F-16/79, a planned export version powered by the older and less powerful J79 engine, prompting the Air Wing to choose the F-5 instead as initial jet equipment. Once this limit was removed, an order for a dozen F-16C/D Fighting Falcons was placed under the Peace Crown program.  Deliveries commenced on 23 May 1990, just before the country became involved in the Gulf War.  The new F-16 unit was based at the newly constructed Sheik Isa Air Base alongside the F-5s.  A second batch of ten F-16s commenced delivery in 2000 under the Peace Crown II program. The new aircraft represented a further increase in the air force's combat capabilities, as they were equipped to carry the AMRAAM missile, first used by the USAF in 1992.  Air-to-air armament had been limited to the short-range AIM-9M Sidewinder missile and internal cannon through the Gulf War.  After the war, the country began to acquire more advanced weapons, including the AIM-7M Sparrow radar-guided air-to-air missile and LANTIRN navigation and targeting pod for air-to-ground weapons that would also be acquired such as the GBU-10/12 laser guided bombs and AGM-65D/G Maverick air-to-ground missiles.

In July 2000, Bahrain signed a deal with BAE Systems to establish a pilot academy based around the Hawk Trainer, similar to the NFTC in Canada. Subsequently, orders were placed for Slingsby T67 Firefly and BAE Hawk trainers. The first trainers were delivered in October 2006.

Upgrade of the helicopter force has included new utility transports, and on 19 June 2007, Bahrain signed a letter of offer and acceptance for nine UH-60M Black Hawk helicopters to be purchased as part of the Foreign Military Sales program through the United States Army.  These are designated for use in a variety of roles, including combat search and rescue.  They were the international launch customer for the UH-60M variant of the venerable S-70 helicopter family. Deliveries commenced on 1 December 2009

A single Sikorsky S-92 VVIP helicopter was purchased by the Air Force in 2007 and placed in service with the Bahrain Royal Flight.

In 2018, Lockheed Martin was awarded a $1.1 billion contract to produce 16 F-16 Viper Block 70 fighter aircraft for Bahrain, the U.S. Department of Defense said in a release.

Work under the $1,124,545,002 fixed-price-incentive-firm contract is expected to be complete by 30 September 2023, the Friday, 22 June release said.

In October, the government of Bahrain announced that it had finalized a $3.8 billion deal with Lockheed for the F-16 purchase. Bahrain Royal Air Force commander Major General Shaikh Hamad bin Abdullah Al Khalifa said the Gulf state hoped the first planes will be delivered in 2021.

The sale of F-16 Vipers and related equipment to Bahrain was first approved by the U.S. State Department in 2016 during the Obama administration but it was delayed over human rights concerns. President Donald Trump dropped the human rights conditions last year.

The State Department then approved the sale of 19 aircraft worth $2.78 billion, and another $1.1 billion to upgrade Bahrain's existing fleet of 20 F-16s to the Viper configuration in September 2017. The proposed sales also include additional equipment and support. Hamid said in October that the purchase of the other three aircraft was still a possibility.

Incidents and accidents 
This was the first F-16 loss for Bahrain and attributed to the pilot becoming disoriented during maneuvers.
 30 December 2015:  An F-16 Fighting Falcon crashed in Jizan Province, Saudi Arabia while supporting the Saudi Arabian-led intervention in Yemen.  The pilot was recovered safely and the crash was attributed to technical issues.

Current

Squadrons

Bases

Personnel
The air force had 650 personnel in 1992 and 1,500 in 2009.

Aircraft

Current inventory

Future 
Bahrain is planning to recapitalize its fighter fleet.  Replacement of the F-5 fleet is to be accomplished with additional F-16 orders in the near term, while longer-term plans call for a more capable aircraft to be acquired to add to or replace the F-16 fleet.  Bahrain is considering buying the Eurofighter Typhoon, the JAS 39 Gripen, the Dassault Rafale, or the F-35 Lightning II. The British government is in early talks with Bahrain over a potential order for the Eurofighter Typhoon fighter. In September 2016 it was announced that the sale of up to 19 further F-16s had been submitted to the US Congress for approval, however the White House later advised that it would not complete the approval unless it showed progress on human rights issues arising from the Bahraini protests of 2011. In September 2017, the United States Defense Security Cooperation Agency approved the sale of up to 22 F-16 Block 70/72 aircraft, as well as the sale of 20 upgrade kits to upgrade Bahrain's existing F-16 fleet to the F-16V Viper variant, the most advanced variant of the F-16, featuring the AN/APG-83 active electronically scanned array radar, a new mission computer developed by Raytheon, modern cockpit displays and other electronics upgrades. In October 2017, Bahraini officials announced that Bahrain had signed a deal worth $3.8 billion with Lockheed Martin for upgraded F-16s, as well as upgrade kits for the Air Force's existing F-16 fleet.

Bahrain has confirmed its order for 12 Bell AH-1Z Viper, six months after the US Department of State approved the deal, worth an estimated $912 million, under the Foreign Military Sales process. The attack helicopters will be delivered from the second half of 2022.

Helicopters Enhance Training Proficiency of Royal Bahrain Air Force. Bell Textron Inc., a Textron Inc. (NYSE: TXT) company, announced the delivery of 3 Bell 505 helicopters to the Royal Bahrain Air Force. Bell delivered the aircraft during an inspection and acceptance event in February 2023 at Bell’s Mirabel facility

References 

Military of Bahrain
Bahrain
Aviation in Bahrain
Military units and formations established in 1977
Bahrain Defence Force
1977 establishments in Bahrain